Carl Friedrich Schmidt (Fyodor Bogdanovich Schmidt; also known as Friedrich Schmidt;  in Kaisma, Livonia –  in Saint Petersburg) was a Baltic German geologist and botanist in the Russian Empire. He is acknowledged as the founder of Estonian geology. In the mid-19th century, he researched Estonian oil shale, kukersite, and named it as kuckers.

Main papers of Friedrich Schmidt research the stratigraphy and fauna of Lower Palaeozoic rocks in Estonia and the neighboring areas. In 1885 he became academician of St. Petersburg Academy of Sciences. He won the Wollaston Medal, awarded by the Geological Society of London, in 1902.

Friedrich Schmidt was the first European to "discover" the Sakhalin Fir on the Russian island of Sakhalin in 1866, but he did not introduce it to Europe. The Schmidt Peninsula (Sakhalin) was named after him.

Notes

1832 births
1908 deaths
People from Põhja-Pärnumaa Parish
People from the Governorate of Livonia
Baltic-German people
Russian geologists
Estonian geologists
Biologists from the Russian Empire
19th-century Estonian botanists
Full members of the Saint Petersburg Academy of Sciences
Wollaston Medal winners
Oil shale researchers